Nizhny Alyshtan (Tübänge Alaştan) is a rural locality (a selo) in Bulyakayevsky Selsoviet, Fyodorovsky District, Bashkortostan, Russia. The population was 88 as of 2010. There is 1 street.

Geography 
Nizhny Alyshtan is located 17 km north of Fyodorovka (the district's administrative centre) by road. Verkhny Alyshtan is the nearest rural locality.

References 

Rural localities in Fyodorovsky District